The 2020 New York Red Bulls II season is the sixth ever season of competitive soccer played by the New York Red Bulls II, the reserve team of Major League Soccer's New York Red Bulls. The side participates in the USL Championship, the second-tier of American soccer.

Current roster

Competitive

USL Championship

Standings — Group F

Match results

U.S. Open Cup 

Due to their ownership by a more advanced level professional club, Red Bulls II is one of 15 teams expressly forbidden from entering the Cup competition.

Player statistics

Top scorers

 Updated to matches played on September 27, 2020.

References

New York Red Bulls II seasons
New York Red Bulls II
New York Red Bulls II
New York Red Bulls